NGC 1807 is an asterism at the border of the constellations Orion and Taurus near the open cluster NGC 1817. NGC 1807 has an apparent size of 5.4' and an apparent magnitude of 7.0.

References

External links
 

1807
Orion (constellation)
Taurus (constellation)